Framingham State University (Framingham State or FSU) is a public university in Framingham, Massachusetts. It offers undergraduate programs as well as graduate programs, including MBA, MEd, and MS.

History

As the first secretary of the newly created Board of Education in Massachusetts, Horace Mann instituted school reforms that included the creation of an experimental normal school, the first one in the United States, in Lexington, in July 1839. The initial name of the school was the Normal School in Lexington. Cyrus Peirce was its first principal or president. A second normal school was opened in September 1839 in West Barre (the school later moved to Westfield) followed by Bridgewater State College the next year. Growth forced the first normal school's relocation to West Newton in 1843, where it was firstly named the Normal School in West Newton before changing again to the State Normal School in West Newton two years later in 1845. 

The school would last in West Newton for only ten years before moving to its present site on Bare Hill in Framingham in 1853. At this time, the school became the State Normal School in Framingham. Nevertheless, the school would change its name two more times in its first decades in Framingham, becoming Framingham Normal School in 1865 and Framingham State Normal School in 1889. In 1922, the school granted its first Bachelor of Science in Education degrees in conjunction with its adoption of a four-year study program. Ten years later all Massachusetts' normal schools were renamed state teachers colleges, with degreed teachers predominating its graduating classes; the school thus became the State Teachers College at Framingham. This name, however, would last only until 1945 when it was slightly adjusted to the Framingham State Teachers College.

In 1960, the name changed yet again to the State College at Framingham after Bachelor of Arts degrees were added. This name was slightly adjusted five years later to just Framingham State College, the name it would subsequently take into the twenty first century. In subsequent years, Masters' of Education, Arts, and Science degrees were added as well, remaining a part of the school's curriculum today. In 2007, the college began offering the Master's of Business Administration (MBA) degree. In October 2010, seven of the state colleges became state universities, unaffiliated with the University of Massachusetts system; at this time, the school adopted its current name: Framingham State University. The measure was signed into law by Massachusetts Governor Deval Patrick on July 28, 2010.

Campus

The  campus is located in Framingham, Massachusetts. Seven residence halls house over 1,500 students. The Henry Whittemore Library has over 200,000 volumes, Wi-Fi, access to over 70,000 electronic journals, and includes Archives and Special Collections. Framingham State University is located on the 282 foot (86 meter) high Bare Hill (also known as Normal Hill) and provides views of Boston, Massachusetts 20 miles (32 kilometers) away.

Sustainability
In 2007, the school signed the American College and University Presidents Climate Commitment. That year, Massachusetts issued Executive Order No. 484, which mandated reductions in greenhouse gas emissions and energy consumption for all state agencies and institutions. Greenhouse gases must be reduced 80% by 2050.  In 2010, the school adopted a plan to convert its heating plant to natural gas and to
convert its central chilled water plant to electric chillers.

Framingham State University was named a "Green College" by the Princeton Review in 2010 and 2011. It was one of 22 schools in Massachusetts to receive the distinction, and one of 311 nationwide. It was named to the list again in 2013.

Organization
Framingham State University is led by an eleven-member Board of Trustees. The governor appoints nine trustees to five-year terms, renewable once.  The Framingham State University Alumni Association elects one trustee for a single five-year term. Finally, the student body elects one student trustee for a one-year term. In addition to five full board meetings each year, which are open to the public, the board also meets in standing committees.

The university's annual budget is $105 million, and the school has 775 full and part-time employees. Framingham State University is accredited by the New England Commission of Higher Education.

Student life

Framingham State University has an Office of Student Involvement and Leadership Development and a Center for Inclusive Excellence. Framingham State University also owns and operates a radio station WDJM-FM on 91.3 FM.

Enrollment 
Total enrollment (Fall 2021): 4,495 total (3,213 undergraduate and 1,282 graduate students)

 Men: 44% (1,398 students)
 Women: 56% (1,815 students)
 Commuters (degree seeking full-time undergraduates only): 53% (1,445 students)
 Residents (degree seeking full-time undergraduates only): 47% (1,279 students)

Athletics

Framingham State University fields 14 varsity athletic teams (6 men's, 8 women's) competing at the NCAA Division III level and 4 club athletic teams (1 men's, 2 women's, 1 co-ed) that compete in various leagues. The athletic teams are known as the Framingham State Rams.

Notable alumni
Anna Brackett, nineteenth century philosopher, educator
Olivia A. Davidson, co-founder of Tuskegee Institute and wife of Booker T. Washington
Lucie Caroline Hager (1853–1903), author
Jennie Howard, member of a pioneering group of educators who founded normal schools in Argentina
Paul J. LeBlanc, President of Southern New Hampshire University; former President of Marlboro College
Christa McAuliffe (Class of 1970), astronaut, participant in Teacher in Space Project, died in Space Shuttle Challenger disaster. Center and memorial on campus in McAuliffe's honor.
Brian J. Moran, Chair of the Democratic Party of Virginia
Joshua Onujiogu, NFL linebacker
Rebecca Pennell, first woman college professor in the United States, and niece of Horace Mann
Charlotte Champe Stearns, mother of T. S. Eliot.
Richard Thompson, Member of the Maine House of Representatives
Ruth Graves Wakefield, inventor of the chocolate chip cookie
Electa Nobles Lincoln Walton (1824–1908), educator, lecturer, writer, and suffragist

References

External links
 
 Official athletics website

 
Educational institutions established in 1839
Framingham, Massachusetts
Public universities and colleges in Massachusetts
Universities and colleges in Middlesex County, Massachusetts